Joe's Diner is a placeholder name for a fictional or hypothetical everyman's restaurant. Although there are franchises that use the name, its rhetorical use is often to describe a small, local business contrasted against large businesses or franchises. The phrase "Eat at Joe's" is a complementary fictional or hypothetical typical advertisement for such an establishment, and has itself become a snowclone in the form of X at Joe's, Eat at Y's, or simply X at Y's. It has also been noted that "[a] 'Joe's Diner' is an example of a weak name that would likely be unsuccessful suing another Joe's Diner in another state" for trademark infringement.

Overview
In addition to the fictional and hypothetical senses, there are of course many real eating establishments named "Joe's Diner". Some were so named prior to the popularity of the term as a placeholder name, and their existence contributed to the rise of this placeholder name. A famous example is the Joe's Diner located in Lee, Massachusetts, which was the subject of Norman Rockwell's work "The Runaway". Reporting on this iconic image, the New Yorker observed:

The actual Joe of Joe's Diner is the man behind the counter in this classic picture. Others were created after the name became popular for this purpose, and were named to take advantage of the term. The grocery store chain Trader Joe's uses "Joe's Diner" as its imprint for certain store brand frozen entrees.

The corresponding expression, "Eat at Joe's", was a frequently-used gag in the Warner Bros. and MGM cartoons during the 1940s, typically used when an image of a neon sign or other complicated tubing would appear.

See also

 Sloppy Joe's, an actual restaurant in Key West, Florida
 Joe's Crab Shack, an American seafood restaurant chain that frequently uses the phrase "Eat at Joe's" for their restaurants.
 Eskimo Joe's, an actual restaurant in Stillwater, Oklahoma that has used the phrase

References

Placeholder names
Fictional restaurants